Beatrice (formerly Salmon Creek) is a locality in Humboldt County, California.

The original name of Salmon Creek was changed to Beatrice when the first post office opened in 1884 in honor of its first postmaster Beatrice White. The Beatrice post office closed for good in 1955.

References

Former settlements in Humboldt County, California